The Distinguished Navy Cross is a decoration of the Armed Forces of the Philippines (AFP) which recognizes distinguished heroism. The heroism must be evidenced by voluntary action in the face of great danger above and beyond the call of duty while participating in naval operations. The result must be so exceptional and outstanding as to set the recipient apart from his comrades. It is awarded by the Chief of Staff of the AFP, or Unified Command and Major Service Commanders to AFP military personnel who are serving in any capacity with the Philippine Navy or with the naval component of the Major Services.

Description of the award 

The award is a gold Maltese cross. At the center is the Philippine Navy seal consisting of a gold-plated Philippine sea lion holding a dagger in its right hand and a Sampaguita in the left, wholly superimposed on an anchor. The seal is placed on a navy blue disc surrounded by laurel leaves. The ribbon is cornflower in color and has three small white lines at the center.

References 

Military awards and decorations of the Philippines